Dundalk Stadium is a horse and greyhound racing venue in Ireland. It is located to the north of Dundalk in County Louth.

The total build cost €35million with a modern grandstand, elevated viewing areas, restaurant and bars.

Horse racing
The Dundalk all-weather horse track to go alongside the new greyhound track that had opened earlier, officially opened on 26 August 2007 costing a further €24million.

The course is a floodlit 1¼ mile left-handed oval, and races are run on an all-weather Polytrack surface.

A turf racecourse at Dundalk, which was mainly used for National Hunt events, was closed in 2001. The present all-weather track, reserved for flat races, was opened in August 2007. The highest class horse races to be run at the venue are the Diamond Stakes, which was promoted from Listed to Group 3 status in 2009, and the Mercury Stakes which was upgraded to Group 3 status in 2018.

Notable races

Greyhound racing
In 1999 the Dundalk Race Company PLC and Dundealgan Greyhound Racing Company Limited merged to form Dundalk Racing (1999) Ltd. This would allow a new horse racing circuit to be built over the existing turf course and a greyhound track inside the main course. The previous Dundalk Ramparts Greyhound Stadium was closed on 20 November 2000 during which time the horse racecourse was undergoing major changes and despite resistance from the Horseracing Authority both sides were encouraged by the success of Paschal Taggart's Shelbourne Park venture.

The Irish racing scene was experiencing some promising growth and Dundalk officially opened their new Dundalk Stadium on 29 November 2003 to the cost of €11 million. The minister for sport John O'Donoghue conducted the opening honours and thanks were given by CEO Jim Martin to Paschal Taggart chairman of the Bord na gCon/Irish Greyhound Board for their help.

The track measures 550 yards in circumference providing a galloping circuit as opposed to the previous tight circuit of 440 yards. The kennels are located in a renovated building that was formerly the Tote for the racecourse but plans for a new eighty runner complex are in motion.

Competitions
The Dundalk International is held annually.  It is a prestigious invitation event held for Ireland's leading greyhounds and also attracts some of the UK's top hounds. The event is one of the richest one-off races in Ireland (€20,000 in 2016) and is an integral part of the Irish greyhound racing calendar after being inaugurated in 1968. The Irish Sprint Cup (formerly the Irish National Cup) arrived at the track in 2004.

Dundalk International
Irish Sprint Cup

Track records
Current

Previous

References

 
Horse racing venues in the Republic of Ireland
Greyhound racing venues in the Republic of Ireland
Sports venues in County Louth
Sport in County Louth
Sport in Dundalk
Sports venues completed in 2003
2003 establishments in Ireland
21st-century architecture in the Republic of Ireland